Kevin Tod Haug is a visual effects supervisor who has worked in the film industry since the 1970s. He and Chris Corbould were nominated for the BAFTA Award for Best Special Visual Effects for their work on Quantum of Solace (2008).

Haug began in the film industry in the 1970s as a motion control programmer. In the 1980s, he became involved with video productions that began using computer-generated effects. In the following decade, he worked on visual effects for television commercials and for two music videos directed by Mark Romanek. Haug's first role as visual effects supervisor came with The Game when one of its producers Ceán Chaffin hired him. Haug was active as a visual effects supervisor from 1997 through 2003 before he decided to do more modest visual effects work for independent film directors. He worked as visual effects designer for Marc Forster on the 2004 film Finding Neverland. Haug said the position was similar to production designer in how it had greater involvement earlier in a film's production rather than at the end. Haug was also one of the founders of the production service FX Cartel.

Credits

Film

The Game (1997) – visual effects supervisor
Fight Club (1999) – visual effects supervisor
The Cell (2000) – visual effects supervisor
Panic Room (2002) – visual effects supervisor
A Wrinkle in Time (2003) – visual effects supervisor
Finding Neverland (2004) – visual effects designer
Stay (2005) – visual effects designer
Stranger than Fiction (2006) – visual effects designer
The Kite Runner (2007) – visual effects designer
Mr. Magorium's Wonder Emporium (2007) – visual effects designer
Quantum of Solace (2008) – visual effects designer
The Twilight Saga: Eclipse (2010) – visual effects supervisor
Conan the Barbarian (2011) – visual effects shoot supervisor
Machine Gun Preacher (2011) – visual effects supervisor (South Africa)
The Time Being (2012) – visual effects designer
Kingsman: The Secret Service (2014) – visual effects supervisor (HEM sequence)
Dominion (2016) – visual effects designer
Fallen (2016) – VFX unit director
Nightmare Cinema ("This Way to Egress" segment) (2019) – visual effects designer

Television
Eerie, Indiana (1991–1992) – visual effects supervisor
American Gods (2017–present) – visual effects designer
Nightflyers (upcoming) – visual effects designer, one episode

References

External links
 

Living people
Visual effects supervisors
Year of birth missing (living people)